Rugby union at the 1979 South Pacific Games was held in Fiji at the newly renovated National Stadium in Suva, with eight men's teams competing. Tonga beat the host nation Fiji by 6–3 in the final to win the gold medal and finish the tournament undefeated. New Caledonia defeated Western Samoa by 9–8 in the third place match to win the bronze medal.

Medal summary

Men's tournament

Standings
Competition tables after the group stage:

Group A matches

* denotes team did not award caps for the match.

Group B matches

* denotes team did not award caps for the match.

Play-offs

See also
Rugby union at the Pacific Games

References

Rugby union
1979
1979 rugby union tournaments for national teams
International rugby union competitions hosted by Fiji